Vitalii Volodymyrovych Skakun (19 August 1996 – 24 February 2022) was a Ukrainian marine combat engineer who was posthumously awarded the Order of the Gold Star. He sacrificed his life in the 2022 Russian invasion of Ukraine while blowing up a bridge in Henichesk to slow the advance of Russian troops during the Kherson offensive.

Early life 
Skakun was born on 19 August 1996 in Berezhany in western Ukraine. He attended the No. 3 school in Berezhany, where his mother was a member of the teaching staff. Later in Lviv, Skakun graduated from Higher Vocational School No. 20, where he studied to be a welder. He graduated from Lviv Polytechnic. In 2018, he lived for six months in Leszno, where he worked as a construction worker.

Military career 
During the 2022 Russian invasion of Ukraine, Skakun's battalion was deployed to protect the town of Henichesk, located near the Isthmus of Perekop. As a Russian armored column approached the position, Ukrainian forces decided to destroy the Henichesk bridge, in order to impede the advance of Russian troops travelling northward from Crimea during the Kherson offensive. Skakun, a combat engineer, volunteered to place mines on the bridge.

On 24 February 2022, after placing the explosives, Skakun did not have enough time to withdraw from the bridge and, after communicating his intentions to his fellow soldiers, detonated the mines, killing himself and destroying the bridge. His actions slowed the Russian advance, allowing his battalion time to regroup.

Legacy 
On 26 February 2022, Skakun was posthumously awarded the Order of the Gold Star, the military version of the title of Hero of Ukraine, by Ukrainian President Volodymyr Zelenskyy.

On 28 February 2022, the Czech representative of one of Prague's city districts, Libor Bezděk, proposed to rename a bridge in Korunovační Street, which is the address of the Russian embassy, to Vitalij Skakun bridge. The proposal was accepted by the district and was forwarded to Prague City Council.

On 1 March 2022, the city council of Berezhany awarded the title of "Honorary Citizen of Berezhany" to Skakun.

On 7 March 2022, he was granted honorary citizenship of Leszno.

References

1996 births
2022 deaths
Lviv Polytechnic alumni
People from Berezhany
Recipients of the Order of Gold Star (Ukraine)
Southern Ukraine campaign
21st-century Ukrainian engineers
Ukrainian military engineers
Ukrainian military personnel killed in the 2022 Russian invasion of Ukraine